Public anthropology, according to Robert Borofsky, a professor at Hawaii Pacific University, "demonstrates the ability of anthropology and anthropologists to effectively address problems beyond the discipline—illuminating larger social issues of our times as well as encouraging broad, public conversations about them with the explicit goal of fostering social change" (Borofsky 2004). The work of Partners In Health is one illustration of using anthropological methods to solve big or complicated problems.

Relation to applied anthropology

Merrill Singer has criticized the concept of public anthropology on the grounds that it ignores applied anthropology. He wrote: "given that many applied anthropologists already do the kinds of things that are now being described as PA, it is hard to understand why a new label is needed, except as a device for distancing public anthropologists from applied anthropologists" (Singer 2000: 6). Similarly, Barbara Rylko-Bauer wrote: "one has to ask what is the purpose of these emerging labels that consciously distinguish themselves from applied/practicing anthropology? While they may serve the personal interests of those who develop them, it is hard to see how they serve the broader interests of the discipline" (Rylko-Bauer 2000: 6). Eric Haanstad responded to Singer's claim by arguing that public anthropology does not necessarily entail the exclusion of applied anthropology (Haanstad 2001a). Alan Jeffery Fields defended the concept of public anthropology by claiming it is "a useful trope for one important reason: it calls attention to the fact that there is a division between public and academic perceptions" (Fields 2001a).

Borofsky, who coined the term, prefers not to get drawn into such arguments, especially since the term was originally merely coined for a book series published by the University of California Press. He wrote: "I feel uncomfortable getting caught up in what Sigmund Freud called the 'narcissism of small differences'—related groups arguing over small differences to differentiate their identities. There are too many serious problems for anthropology to address" (Borofsky 2019:130). He continued:

Borofsky concluded: "I do not see what is gained by trying to attach applied or public to Ben Finney's work. What he did was impressive. He played a leading role in the resurrection of Hawaiian voyaging and, through that, the Hawaiian Cultural Renaissance" (Borofsky 2019:130). Public anthropology, for Borofsky, is more than a label and more than an intellectual dispute. Just like applied anthropology, it is about what anthropologists can achieve when they address problems beyond the discipline.

See also
Public sociology

References 
Borofsky, Robert. 2019. An Anthropology of Anthropology. Center for Public Anthropology, Open Anthropology series.  (ebook)
Borofsky, Robert. 2004 Conceptualizing Public Anthropology. Electronic document, https://web.archive.org/web/20070414153742/http://www.publicanthropology.org/Defining/definingpa.htm, accessed April 11, 2007.
Fields, Alan Jeffrey. 2001a Responsible Public Anthropology. Public Anthropology: The Graduate Journal. Electronic document, https://web.archive.org/web/20070927101934/http://www.publicanthropology.org/Journals/Grad-j/Wisconsin/fields.htm, accessed April 12, 2007.
Haanstad, Eric. 2001a Anthropology Revitalized: Public Anthropology and Student Activism. Public Anthropology: The Graduate Journal. Electronic document, https://web.archive.org/web/20070716025855/http://www.publicanthropology.org/Journals/Grad-j/Wisconsin/haanstad.htm, accessed April 12, 2007.
Kubota, Gary. 2018 Ben Finney, a founder of the Polynesian Voyaging Society, dies at 83. Star Advertiser, December 31. Electronic document, https://www.staradvertiser.com/2017/05/24/breaking-news/ben-finney-a-founder-of-the-polynesian-voyaging-society-dies-at-83/ (accessed December 31, 2018).
Rylko-Bauer, Barbara. 2000 Toward a More Inclusive Relevant Anthropology. Society for Applied Anthropology Newsletter 11(2): 6-7.
Singer, Merrill. 2000 Why I Am Not a Public Anthropologist. Anthropology News 41(6): 6-7.

Further reading

Borofsky, Robert (2019). An Anthropology of Anthropology. Center for Public Anthropology, Open Anthropology series.  (ebook)

Caliskan, Koray (2022). "The Great Tragedy of Anthropology: An Interview with Gillian Tett." Journal of Cultural Economy (December 7). Taylor & Francis online.

Harrison, Ira E. and Harrison, Faye V. Eds. (1998). African American Pioneers in Anthropology. Urbana: University of Illinois Press. 
 Harrison, Faye. V. (1997) Decolonizing Anthropology: Moving Further Toward an Anthropology of Liberation. Washington D.C.: American Anthropological Association. 
 Luktehaus, Nancy C. 2008.  Margaret Mead: The Making of An American Icon. Princeton: Princeton University Press. 

Tett, Gillian. (2021). Anthro-Vision: A New Way to See in Business and Life. New York: Simon & Schuster.

External links 
 The Prism: Anthropological Reflections on Culture & Society
 Public Anthropology.org
 Partners In Health

Anthropology
Anthropology